The Tamil Nadu Transmission Corporation Limited  (TANTRANSCO) is an electric power transmission system operator owned by Government of Tamil Nadu.  It was established in November 2010, as a result of restructuring the Tamil Nadu Electricity Board. It is a subsidiary of TNEB Limited.

Substations
The TANTRANSCO maintains all the substations in Tamil Nadu apart from the Power Grid Corporation of India Limited (PGCIL). These substations fall under one of the following categories:
400/230 kV substations.
230/110 kV substations.
110 kV substations.
33 kV substations.

less than this kV transmissions as 22 kV and 11 kV are used for distribution.

66/11 kV substations were in use earlier. This is no longer the case anymore.

Vision
To provide adequate and reliable transmission infrastructure at competitive rates

References

External links
 
 Power Grid Corporation Web-Site

Electric power transmission system operators in India
Energy in Tamil Nadu
State agencies of Tamil Nadu
State electricity agencies of India
Indian companies established in 2010
Energy companies established in 2010
Companies based in Tamil Nadu
2010 establishments in Tamil Nadu